A wine bar is a tavern-like business focusing on selling wine, rather than liquor or beer. A typical feature of many wine bars is a wide selection of wines available by the glass. Some wine bars are profiled on wines of a certain type of origin, such as Italian wine or Champagne. While many wine bars are private "stand-alone" establishments, in some cases, wine bars are associated with a specific wine retailer or other outlet of wine, to provide additional marketing for that retailer's wine portfolio. In countries where licensing regulations allow this, some wine bars also sell the wines they serve, and effectively function as a hybrid between a wine shop and a wine bar.

United Kingdom
Wine bar chains in the UK include All Bar One.

United States
Although the trend of wine bars in the United States was not well received in the 1980s, they began to gain popularity in the 1990s. By early 2000, wine bars became very popular and started popping up in many metropolitan neighborhoods across the country. Wine bars now rival the local hangouts such as coffee shops and local bars. The wine bar phenomenon offers the taste before you buy philosophy.

Wine bars add a new dimension to wine tasting. They seek to remove the association of wine with upscale clientele and overwhelming wine lists and replace it with a more casual and relaxing atmosphere. Many of these bars are furnished with nooks and cozy booths encased in rich colors and plush surroundings in hopes their guests will linger. Wine bars look to embrace the intellectual stimulation linked to wine and offer an alternative to the bar scene. The laid-back environment lends itself to a good socializing setting with a less crowded feel and more intimate appeal.

Modern wine bars have begun to incorporate a larger variety of foods. Traditionally associated with cheeses and desserts, wine bars are looking to combine wine with appetizer-sized gourmet selections to enhance the palate. The concept brings the tastes of fancy restaurants to a dressed-down setting. Restaurant owners and chefs sometimes take the opposite approach and use wine bars as an opportunity for expansion.

See also

 Types of drinking establishments

References

Bar
Types of drinking establishment